Luke Munana (born January 10, 1979) is an American-born former competitive ice dancer who represented Mexico in international competition with his sister Laura Munana. The two competed for the United States until 2004. After that, they competed at the Four Continents Championships and the World Figure Skating Championships for Mexico, as well as competing on the Grand Prix circuit.  The Munanas were the first ice dancers to compete internationally for Mexico. They retired after the 2006–2007 season.

Results
Ice dance (with Munana)

External links
 

American male ice dancers
Mexican ice dancers
1979 births
Living people
Figure skaters from San Jose, California
21st-century Mexican dancers